The 1914–15 season was Stoke's sixth and final season in the Southern Football League.

After the resignation of chairman Hurst and manager Alfred Barker, the board elected Mr E. Reynish as the new chairman and brought in Scotsman Peter Hodge as the club's new manager. With war on the horizon, there was debate as to whether football should be cancelled; it was not, but a number of clubs in the Southern League Division Two withdrew, claiming it to be 'unpatriotic'. Stoke had a good season and won the division with 38 points, which prompted the club to seek re-election to the Football League. They were successful in their efforts and after seven seasons Stoke could finally reclaim their place in the Football League. However, at the end of the season the league was indeed cancelled due to the war and Stoke would have to wait until 1919 to play league football.

Season review

League
The 1914–15 season opened up against the backdrop of World War I and there was a lot of debate to whether the football should continue. The season started but after a number of games several clubs resigned from the Southern League claiming it to be unpatriotic. These teams were Abertillery, Caerphilly, Leyton and Mardy. Their records were expunged and results against these clubs were void.

Stoke, now under the management of 39-year-old Peter Hodge the former boss of Raith Rovers, led the Division from virtually from the start. There was a familiar feeling to the squad with Dick Hope and Fred McCarthy the only players to come from outside the local area. Two departures in 1914 were William Smith whose long term leg injury got the better of him and skipper Ernest Mullineux. An impressive start was made to the 1914–15 season and a draw against Brentford on Christmas Day was only the third point Stoke had dropped. Stoke went on to comfortably claim the league title. There was also the emergence of Arthur Watkin who top scored with 24 league goals.

Stoke's success prompted them to apply for election to the Football League at the annual general meeting held on 19 July 1915.  The bottom two clubs Leicester Fosse and Glossop North End, were obliged to seek re-election, but Glossop only secured one vote, while Stoke took 21 and saw them duly re-instated in the league. Later on in the meeting it was also announced that the League would be cancelled due to World War I and Stoke would have to wait longer to re-claim their place in the Football League.

FA Cup
Stoke recorded their largest FA Cup victory this season an 11–0 victory over Stourbridge albeit in the preliminary round. Stoke went on to beat Birmingham Corporation Tramways and Brierley Hill Alliance before losing to Walsall.

Final league table

Results

Stoke's score comes first

Legend

Southern Football League Division Two

FA Cup

Squad statistics

References

Stoke City F.C. seasons
Stoke